María Estela Salas Marín (born 25 May 1969 in Chachalacas, Veracruz) is a Paralympian athlete from Mexico competing mainly in the throwing events.

Maria competed in the 2004 Summer Paralympics in the throwing events. She won a combined F32-34/52/53 shot put gold medal and also won a silver in the F33/34/52/53 javelin as well as competing in the F32-34/51-53 discus.

For some unknown reason she did not compete at the shot put Rio 2016 competition.

References

External links
 profile on paralympic.org

1969 births
Living people
Sportspeople from Veracruz
Paralympic athletes of Mexico
Athletes (track and field) at the 2004 Summer Paralympics
Paralympic gold medalists for Mexico
Paralympic silver medalists for Mexico
Mexican female shot putters
Mexican female javelin throwers
Medalists at the 2004 Summer Paralympics
Paralympic medalists in athletics (track and field)
Medalists at the 2015 Parapan American Games
21st-century Mexican women